The Russian Super Cup is a one-match football annual competition. Its official sponsored name is OLIMPBET Russian Supercup. The two participating clubs are the Russian Premier League champions and the Russian Cup winners. If the Premier League and the Cup are won by the same team, then the other participant is the league runners-up. The match is played at the beginning of the season, typically in July.

The trophy has been contested since 2003.

Matches

Statistics by team

Statistics by player

See also
USSR Super Cup

References
Notes

Citations

External links
 Russian Super Cup at the RFPL website
  Department of professional football of the Russian Football Union
 Russia - Cup Finals, RSSSF.com

 
Russia
Super Cup
Recurring sporting events established in 2003
2003 establishments in Russia